The 1968 United States presidential election in Minnesota took place on November 5, 1968 as part of the 1968 United States presidential election. Voters chose ten electors, or representatives to the Electoral College, who voted for president and vice president.

Minnesota was won by the Democratic Party candidate, incumbent Vice President Hubert Humphrey, the home-state favorite, won the state over former Vice President Richard Nixon by 199,095 votes, giving him one of his fourteen victories in the election (13 states plus D.C.).

The American candidate, former Alabama governor George Wallace, failed to make a substantial impact in Minnesota, as his base of support was primarily in the Deep South. While Wallace took 13.5% of the national popular vote and won five states of the former Confederacy, he only took 4.43% of the vote in Minnesota, his weakest state in the Midwestern United States.

Nationally, Nixon won the election with 301 electoral votes, though he led Humphrey by less than a percent in the popular vote. The election permanently disrupted the New Deal Coalition, which had been dominant in presidential politics since 1932.

This was the first election since 1916 in which Minnesota backed the losing candidate in a presidential election.

Until 2016, this was the last presidential election in Minnesota where any county was won with over seventy percent of the popular vote. In 2016, Donald Trump carried Morrison County with 73% of the vote, and Todd County with 70.75% of the vote. In this case, Humphrey won the following counties over this threshold: Carlton County, Lake County, and Saint Louis County. Nixon became the first Republican to win a  presidential election without winning Minnesota.

Results

Results by county

See also
 United States presidential elections in Minnesota

Notes

References

1968
Minnesota
1968 Minnesota elections